Inwood is a census-designated place (CDP) in Polk County, Florida, United States. The population was 6,925 at the time of the 2000 United States Census. It is part of the Lakeland–Winter Haven Metropolitan Statistical Area.

Geography

Inwood is located at  (28.038354, -81.766168).

The four lakes in Inwood are as follows:

 Lake Blue
 Lake Cannon
 Lake Jessie
 Lake Deer

Lake Blue is the only lake located entirely within Inwood.

Demographics

As of the census of 2000, there were 6,925 people, 2,835 households, and 1,774 families residing in the CDP. The racial makeup of the CDP was 68.29% White, 23.51% African American, 0.38% Native American, 1.01% Asian, 3.51% from other races, and 3.31% from two or more races. Hispanic or Latino of any race were 7.86% of the population.

There were 2,835 households, out of which 28.8% had children under the age of 18 living with them, 40.4% were married couples living together, 15.6% had a female householder with no husband present, and 37.4% were non-families. 30.5% of all households were made up of individuals, and 10.8% had someone living alone who was 65 years of age or older. The average household size was 2.44 and the average family size was 3.05.

In the CDP, the population was spread out, with 26.6% under the age of 18, 10.0% from 18 to 24, 29.0% from 25 to 44, 20.8% from 45 to 64, and 13.6% who were 65 years of age or older. The median age was 35 years. For every 100 females, there were 97.2 males. For every 100 females age 18 and over, there were 92.7 males.

The median income for a household in the CDP was $25,973, and the median income for a family was $29,472. Males had a median income of $22,957 versus $20,024 for females. The per capita income for the CDP was $13,295. About 14.8% of families and 19.1% of the population were below the poverty line, including 24.8% of those under age 18 and 16.4% of those age 65 or over.

Education 
The public schools in Inwood are run by the Polk County School Board. There are 2 public elementary, 1 public middle, and 1 private schools listed in the following:

 Elementary public schools
 Inwood Elementary School 
 Garner Elementary School
 Middle public schools
 Westwood Middle School
 Private schools
 Immanuel Luther Church and School

References

Census-designated places in Polk County, Florida
Census-designated places in Florida